ARA Heroína (pennant number D-12) is the third ship of the MEKO 360H2 series of four destroyers built for the Argentine Navy. The ship is the third ship in the history of the Argentine Navy to bear the name of the corsair frigate , which claimed the Falkland Islands for the United Provinces of the River Plate on 6 November 1820.

The Argentine Navy struggles to meet maintenance and training requirements because of financial problems and import restrictions. In the early 2010s it was reported that the Almirante Brown class were short of spares, suffering engine problems and ordnance, at that time, was past its expiry date.

Construction and career
Heroína and her sister ships were authorized under the Naval Construction National Plan of 1974, an initiative by the Argentine Navy to replace old World War II-vintage warships which were nearing the end of their operational lives. A contract was signed with the Blohm + Voss Shipyards in Hamburg, West Germany for the construction of four MEKO 360H2 destroyers.

Heroína was launched on 17 February 1982. The ship was delivered to the Argentine Navy on 7 November 1983, for her sea trials, following which the ship departed for Argentina, arriving at Puerto Belgrano Naval Base on 21 December.

Heroína was scheduled a major engine and structural overhaul in 2006, following her sister ship . She is currently homeported at Puerto Belgrano as part of the Navy's 2nd Destroyer Division, along with her three sister ships. In July 2019, the Argentine Navy announced that the vessel was to be scrapped. As of 2021, she was reported to have sat idle for more than a decade and was still awaiting spare parts for repairs that were being held in the United Kingdom due to an apparent dispute with a British company.

References

Bibliography
 Guia de los buques de la Armada Argentina 2005-2006. Ignacio Amendolara Bourdette, Editor n/a. (Spanish/English text)

Almirante Brown-class destroyers
Ships built in Hamburg
1982 ships
Destroyers of Argentina